Armchair Science was a British monthly journal of topical and popular science articles published from 1929 to 1940; it ceased publication because of wartime paper shortages.  The first editor was A. Percy Bradley, a mechanical engineer associated with Brooklands, then Professor A. M. Low.   Issue one included: “Wonders of the Night Sky”; “How Flowers Breed and How they Fade”; “We Eat Bad Cheese, and why not Bad Meat?”; and “What is Noise?”.  It cost one shilling, later reduced to sixpence.  The publisher was Gale & Polden Ltd, London.

It reported the splitting of the atom, the chemical identification of Vitamin C, the finishing of the Dutch dam around the Zuyder Zee and developments in television.  Looking to the future it asked “Are Whales Doomed?”, discussed the possibility of stereoscopic cinema, and reported biofuels and power from the sea.

Its editor in 1940, Stuart Macrae, went on to produce weapons for the war effort as part of MD1, known also as "Churchill's Toyshop".

References
 Armchair Science various issues
 Peter J. Bowler (2006) British Journal for the History of Science vol 39 no 2 pages 159–187, June 2006. "Experts and publishers: writing popular science in early twentieth-century Britain, writing popular history of science now"

Monthly magazines published in the United Kingdom
Science and technology magazines published in the United Kingdom
Defunct magazines published in the United Kingdom
Magazines established in 1929
Magazines disestablished in 1940
Popular science magazines